Clavatula petzyae is a species of sea snail, a marine gastropod mollusk in the family Clavatulidae.

Description
The shell grows to a length of 11 mm.

Distribution
This species occurs in the Atlantic Ocean off Ghana.

References

 Boyer, F. & Ryall, P.S., 2006. Two new Clavatulinae species (Caenogastropoda: Turridae) from Ghana. Iberus 24(2): 33–38

External links

 

Endemic fauna of Ghana
petzyae
Gastropods described in 2006